Anne Finch, Countess of Nottingham (October 1668 – 26 September 1743), formerly Anne Hatton, was the second wife of Daniel Finch, 2nd Earl of Nottingham, and the mother of Daniel Finch, 8th Earl of Winchilsea and 3rd Earl of Nottingham.

Early life
Anne was the daughter of Christopher Hatton, 1st Viscount Hatton, and his wife, the former Lady Cecilia Tufton. Her mother was killed in an explosion at Castle Cornet on 30 December 1672. From her father's second marriage, she had two younger half-brothers, William Hatton, 2nd Viscount Hatton and Henry Hatton, 3rd Viscount Hatton.

Her paternal grandparents were Christopher Hatton, 1st Baron Hatton and the former Elizabeth Montagu (a daughter of Sir Charles Montagu). Her mother was the fourth daughter of John Tufton, 2nd Earl of Thanet and Lady Margaret Sackville (eldest daughter and co-heiress of Richard Sackville, 3rd Earl of Dorset).

Personal life
On 29 December 1685, she was married to Daniel Finch, 2nd Earl of Nottingham, who was more than twenty years her senior. The earl's first wife, the former Lady Essex Rich, died in childbirth in 1684, leaving one surviving daughter (Lady Mary Finch, who married William Savile, 2nd Marquess of Halifax and John Ker, 1st Duke of Roxburghe). From Anne's twenty-two pregnancies, the couple had at least thirteen surviving children, including:

 Daniel Finch, 8th Earl of Winchilsea (1689–1769), who was married twice, first to Lady Frances Feilding, and second to Mary Palmer, but had no sons.
 William Finch (1690–1766), who married Charlotte Fermor, and was the father of George Finch, 9th Earl of Winchilsea.
 John Finch (1692–1763), who had one daughter.
 Henry Finch (1694–1761), whose illegitimate daughter, Charlotte (d. 5 April 1810), married  Thomas Raikes, Governor of the Bank of England
 Edward Finch (1697–1771), who became a diplomat and married Elizabeth Palmer. He later took the surname Finch-Hatton, and was the grandfather of George Finch-Hatton, 10th Earl of Winchilsea.
 Essex Finch (1687–1721), who married Sir Roger Mostyn, 3rd Baronet of Mostyn, and had children
 Lady Charlotte Finch (1693–1773), who married Charles Seymour, 6th Duke of Somerset, and had children
 Lady (Cecilia) Isabella Finch (1700–1771), who never married but became first Lady of the Bedchamber to Princess Amelia, and was the owner of 44 Berkeley Square in Mayfair, London.
 Mary Finch (1701–1761) (not to be confused with her elder half-sister of the same name from her father's first marriage), who married Thomas Watson-Wentworth, 1st Marquess of Rockingham, and had children
 Lady Henrietta Finch (1702–1742), who married William Fitzroy, 3rd Duke of Cleveland, and had no children
 Elizabeth Finch (1704–1784), who married William Murray, 1st Earl of Mansfield, and had no children

The countess was appointed a Lady of the Bedchamber to Mary II of England in 1691, and served in that position until the Queen's death in 1694.

Lady Nottingham died on 26 September 1743.

References

External links
Anne Hatton, Countess of Winchilsea (1668-1743), Second wife of 7th Earl of Winchilsea; daughter of 1st Viscount Hatton at the National Portrait Gallery, London

1668 births
1743 deaths
17th-century English nobility
18th-century English nobility
17th-century English women
18th-century English women
English countesses
Daughters of viscounts